Decagram may refer to:
 10 gram, or 0.01 kilogram, a unit of mass, in SI referred to as a dag 
 Decagram (geometry), geometric figure